Arthur Jerome Drossaerts (September 11, 1862 – September 8, 1940) was a Dutch-American prelate of the Roman Catholic Church. He served as Archbishop of San Antonio from 1918 until his death.

Biography
Arthur Drossaerts was born in Breda to Cornelius and Sophie (née de Fraiture) Drossaerts, and studied at several seminaries in the Netherlands. He was ordained to the priesthood by Bishop Adrianus Godschalk on June 15, 1889, and then traveled to the United States at the request of Archbishop Francis Janssens, who assigned Drossaerts to pastoral work in Lake Charles, Louisiana. He initiated the religious education of African-American Catholics, and also served as a pastor in New Orleans, Broussard, and Baton Rouge.

On July 18, 1918, Drossaerts was appointed the fifth Bishop of San Antonio, Texas, by Pope Benedict XV. He received his episcopal consecration on the following December 18 from Archbishop Giovanni Bonzano, with Bishops Theophile Meerschaert and John Marius Laval serving as co-consecrators, in St. Louis Cathedral. Drossaerts was later made an Archbishop upon San Antonio's elevation to the rank of an archdiocese on August 3, 1926.

Throughout his tenure in San Antonio, he provided refuge to numerous clergymen who fled from persecution during the Mexican Revolution, raising over $21,000 for this cause in 1926–1929. 

At the funeral Mass for the late Bishop of Aguascalientes, Drossaerts condemned the perceived lack of American interest in the Church's persecution in Mexico, saying, "Liberty is being crucified at our very door, and the United States looks on with perfect indifference. Despotism seems to have become popular amongst us. Are we not sending endless goodwill parties to Mexico? Are we not courting the friendship and favor of the very men whose hands are simply dripping with the blood of their innocent victims? ... The ominous silence of the American press and pulpit is not understandable." 

Pope Pius XI made him an Assistant at the Pontifical Throne for these efforts on August 19, 1934.

Drossaerts also denounced the women's fashions of his time, which he described as "formerly the exclusive badge of the scarlet woman", lamenting the "degrading spectacle of young women being exhibited and appraised like dogs and cattle."

Death
Archbishop Drossaerts died at Santa Rosa Hospital, three days before his 78th birthday. He was buried at San Fernando Archdiocesan Cemetery in San Antonio.

References

1862 births
1940 deaths
People from Breda
20th-century Dutch Roman Catholic priests
20th-century Roman Catholic archbishops in the United States
Roman Catholic bishops of San Antonio
Roman Catholic archbishops of San Antonio
Dutch emigrants to the United States